RALEIGH is a Canadian experimental indie-rock band from Calgary, AB. Born out of a collaboration between songwriters Brock Geiger and Clea Anais in 2010, the band has evolved to currently include Matt Doherty (drums) and Will Maclellan (bass).

The band has released two full-length records independently, New Times in Black and White (2011), and Sun Grenades & Grenadine Skies (2013) and has toured extensively in Canada. Both albums charted on the Canadian Earshots National Top 50! 

In support of Sun Grenades & Grenadine Skies, the band also toured for three weeks in the UK, and Germany.

Discography 
Powerhouse Bloom (September 29, 2017)
Remixed Sun Grenades EP (May 1, 2014)
Sun Grenades & Grenadine Skies (November 5, 2013)
New Times in Black and White (May 24, 2011)

References 

Musical groups from Calgary